St. Anne's Church, Park Hill, Moseley is a parish church in the Church of England located in Moseley, Birmingham.

History

The church dates from 1874 and is by the architect Frederick Preedy. It is Grade II listed.
It was originally a separate parish, but is now part of a united benefice with St. Mary's Church, Moseley.

List of Vicars
Robert Scott
 Robert Yaxley
Leslie Brotherton
Alan Reynolds
Averyl Bradbook  (2004–2005)
Jeremy Dussek (2007–2014 )
Duncan Strathie (2015–Present)

Patterns of Worship at St Anne's

Regular Sunday Worship

11:00am Sung Eucharist

Patterns of Worship at St Mary's

Regular Sunday Worship

8:00am Holy Communion
10:00am Sung Eucharist
6:30pm Evensong

Weekday Worship

9.00am Morning Prayer

Organ

The organ is by Brindley & Foster and dates from 1907. It was overhauled by Nicholson & Co (Worcester) Ltd in 1984. A specification of the organ can be found on the National Pipe Organ Register

The organ has been sampled and is the instrument which is provided with the Hauptwerk Virtual Organ.

List of Organists

W. Berridge-Hicks 1897 – c. 1912 – ???? (formerly organist of St. Aidan's Church, Small Heath)
Herbert E . Knott c. 1920 and c. 1921
Peter Howard

References

Church of England church buildings in Birmingham, West Midlands
19th-century Church of England church buildings
Grade II listed churches in Birmingham
Moseley